Crowfoot Mountain may refer to:

 Crowfoot Mountain (Alberta) in Alberta, Canada
 Crowfoot Mountain (British Columbia) in British Columbia, Canada